"I Want Action" is the third single from Glam metal band Poison, originally from the album Look What the Cat Dragged In.

The song was released as a single in 1987 on the Enigma label of Capitol Records, and peaked at number 50 on the Billboard Hot 100. "I Want Action" was the first party anthem from the band and was followed by their first ballad, the top 20 Billboard hit single "I Won't Forget You".

Reception
Cash Box said that the song has Poison "at their resounding best," saying that "the tune is every bit as suggestive as its title, pouring on sex and incendiary guitars with a trowel."

Music video
The music video begins at a diner where a waitress is serving food to the band. After a groupie asks for a backstage pass, the band performs on stage.

Albums
On the 2006 re issue of Look What the Cat Dragged In - 20th Anniversary Edition the 7" single remix of the song was released.

"I Want Action" is on the following albums.

 Look What the Cat Dragged In
 Swallow This Live (live version)
 Poison's Greatest Hits: 1986-1996
 Power to the People (live version)
 The Best of Poison: 20 Years of Rock
 Look What the Cat Dragged In - 20th Anniversary Edition
 Poison – Box Set (Collector's Edition)
 Double Dose: Ultimate Hits

Charts

Uses in Media
Featured during the opening credits of the 2003 comedy film Pauly Shore Is Dead.  
Featured in the 2009 indie dramedy Adventureland (film).

References

1986 songs
1987 singles
Songs written by Bobby Dall
Songs written by Bret Michaels
Songs written by Rikki Rockett
Songs written by C.C. DeVille
Poison (American band) songs
Enigma Records singles
Capitol Records singles